is a Japanese professional baseball pitcher who is currently a free agent. He has played with the Nippon Professional Baseball (NPB) for the Yomiuri Giants.

Career
Yomiuri Giants selected Tahara with the seventh selection in the 2011 NPB draft.

On June 11, 2012, Tahara made his NPB debut.

On December 2, 2020, he become a free agent.

References

External links

 NPB.com

1989 births
Living people
Baseball people from Miyazaki Prefecture
Japanese expatriate baseball players in Puerto Rico
Nippon Professional Baseball pitchers
Yomiuri Giants players
Cangrejeros de Santurce (baseball) players